USS LST-451 was a United States Navy  used in the Asiatic-Pacific Theater during World War II.

Construction
LST-451 was laid down on 20 July 1942, under Maritime Commission (MARCOM) contract, MC hull 971, by  Kaiser Shipyards, Vancouver, Washington; launched on 6 October 1942; and commissioned on 21 January 1943.

Service history
During the war, LST-451 was assigned to the Pacific Theater of Operations.To start she made runs to the Aleutian islands delivering materials to the Army's 18th Combat Engineers and the 45th Naval Construction Battalion.  In February  gale force winds broke her mooring lines and she was holed and beached at Lash Bay, Tanaga Island in the Aleutians.   Seabees from CB 45 worked 24-hour shifts over five days to save her and the 800-ton oil cargo.  They got her patched sufficiently for the USS Ute to tow her to a repair facility.   She took part in  the capture and occupation of Saipan in June and July 1944; the Tinian capture and occupation in July 1944; the Battle of Leyte landings October 1944; the Lingayen Gulf landings January 1945; and the assault and occupation of Okinawa Gunto April 1945.

Post-war service
Following the war, LST-451 performed occupation duty in the Far East until mid-February 1946. She returned to the United States and was decommissioned on 22 July 1946, and struck from the Navy list on 25 September, that same year. On 11 December 1947, the tank landing ship was sold to the Learner Co., Oakland, California, and subsequently scrapped.

Honors and awards
LST-451 earned five battle stars for her World War II service.

Notes 

Citations

Bibliography 

Online resources

External links

 

LST-1-class tank landing ships
World War II amphibious warfare vessels of the United States
1942 ships
S3-M2-K2 ships
Ships built in Vancouver, Washington
Ships of the Aleutian Islands campaign